Richard Whitmore (born 22 December 1933 in Hitchin, Hertfordshire) is a broadcaster, writer and actor. Whitmore is best known for his work as a BBC newsreader in the 1970s and 1980s and occasional work as a reporter.

He was educated at the former Hitchin Grammar School, and did not go to university. Whitmore appeared (along with other presenters and newsreaders) in the "Nothing Like a Dame" musical number on the Morecambe and Wise Christmas Show in 1977. Later, he performed professionally on the stage in several productions. In 1991 he appeared as a newscaster in the comedy film King Ralph. In December 2011 he became President of Hitchin Band. He is also the author of several books, including a 2007 biography of Reginald Hine, a historian from Hitchin who committed suicide in 1949.

Whitmore lives in Hitchin with his wife Wendy, whom he married on 26 April 1957. The couple have four daughters and nine grandchildren.

The studio at the Queen Mother Theatre in Hitchin is named in his honour.

References

External links
 

1933 births
Living people
English male journalists
British television newsreaders and news presenters
British radio journalists
English radio personalities
British writers
People from Hitchin
People educated at Hitchin Boys' School
BBC newsreaders and journalists